William Boring may refer to:
 William A. Boring (1859–1937), American architect
 William H. Boring (1841–1932), American Union soldier and Oregon pioneer